Lemon Kittens are a post-punk band, formed in Reading, Berkshire, England in 1977, by Karl Blake and Gary Thatcher. The cast of the band revolved quite frequently, notably counting among its membership musicians such as Danielle Dax and Mark Perry (of Alternative TV) and The Good Missionaries, not to mention Dr Phil Thornton.

Discography
Spoonfed & Writhing (EP 1979, reissued with three extra tracks on CD in 1996)
Cake Beast (EP 1980)
The Big Dentist (LP 1981)
We Buy a Hammer for Daddy (LP 1980, reissued in CD in 1993)
(Those Who Bite The Hand That Feeds Them Sooner Or Later Must Meet The) Big Dentist (LP 1982, reissued in CD in 1994)

The Spoonfed & Writhing EP has gained a re-release, as part of the Step Forward-I Wanna Punk Rock: The Singles Collection, in either CD or vinyl boxed set (Castle Records B000PMG5PC).

In addition, tracks by Lemon Kittens appear on the compilation albums Snatch 2, Hoisting the Black Flag, Perspectives and Distortion, The Wonderful World of Glass vol 1, and Terra Serpentes.

References

External links
http://www.myspace.com/lemonkittensofficial

English rock music groups
English post-punk music groups
Musical groups established in 1977
1977 establishments in England